Clemens August Andreae (1929 – 26 May 1991) was an Austrian economist who served as a professor of political economics and the dean of law and political sciences for the University of Innsbruck. He wrote a book called Der größere Markt – Wirtschaftsintegration vom Atlantik bis zum Ural ("The Larger Market – Economic Integration from the Atlantic to the Urals"). Andreae was scheduled to give the opening speech for the 1986 Salzburg Festival; the opening speech is typically given by a prominent scientist or artist. Andreae replaced Ralf Dahrendorf, a West German sociologist and professor, who withdrew the pledge because he did not want to speak to an audience that included Kurt Waldheim, the president of Austria.

Andreae died in the 26 May 1991 crash of Lauda Air Flight 004 in Thailand. He was leading a group of students from the University of Innsbruck in a tour of the Far East. The passengers on the aircraft included 21 members of the University of Innsbruck, including Andreae, another professor, six assistants, and 13 students. Andreae had often led field visits to Hong Kong.

Works

 Andreae, Clemens August and Dieter Schoen. Der größere Markt: Wirtschaftsintegration vom Atlantik bis zum Ural. Seewald Verlag, 1966.
 Andreae, Clemens August and Volkmar Muthesius. Unser kompliziertes Steurersystem. Beiträge von Clemens A[ugust] Andreae [u. a.] Volkmar Muthesius z. 70. Geburtstag am 19. März 1970. F. Knapp, 1970.
 Andreae, Clemens August and Reinhard Berthold Koester. Taxation: An International Disequilibrium, Issue 16. Akademie der Wissenschaften und der Literatur, 1987. , 9783515051255.
 Andreae, Clemens August (editor: Franz Aubele) Wirtschaft und Gesellschaft: Ausgewählte Schriften in memoriam. , 1994. , 9783428079605.

References
 Parschalk, Norbert and Bernhard Thaler. Südtirol Chronik: das 20. Jahrhundert. , 1999.

Notes

External links

 "Andreae, Clemens-August, 1929–1991." Virtual International Authority File.
 Catalog of works – German National Library 

1929 births
1991 deaths
Academic staff of the University of Innsbruck
Victims of aviation accidents or incidents in 1991
Victims of aviation accidents or incidents in Thailand
20th-century Austrian economists